For information on all University of Louisiana at Monroe sports, see Louisiana–Monroe Warhawks

The Louisiana–Monroe Warhawks Men's track and field program represents the University of Louisiana at Monroe in the sport of track and field. The program includes separate men's and women's teams, both of which compete in Division I of the National Collegiate Athletic Association (NCAA) and the Sun Belt Conference. The Warhawks host their home outdoor meets at Groseclose Track at Brown Stadium, which located on the university's Monroe, Louisiana campus.  The Warhawks track teams are currently led by head coach J.D. Malone.

See also 

 Louisiana–Monroe Warhawks

References

External links